Arthur Potts may refer to:

Arthur Edward Potts (1890–1983), Canadian general officer active in World War II
Arthur Potts (footballer) (1888–1981), English footballer
Arthur Potts (politician) (born 1957), Canadian politician and Ontario MPP for the Toronto district of Beaches—East York
Arthur Potts Dawson (born 1971), chef